Nuro, Inc. is an American robotics company based in Mountain View, California. Founded by Jiajun Zhu and Dave Ferguson, Nuro develops autonomous delivery vehicles and is the first company to receive an autonomous exemption from the National Highway Traffic Safety Administration.

History 
The company was founded by engineers of Google's self driving car project, Waymo. Zhu served as the principal software engineer and Ferguson joined in 2011 as the principal machine learning engineer. Zhu and Ferguson left Waymo in 2016 and founded Nuro that September.

Nuro brought its robotic delivery vehicles to market in January 2018 with $92 million in funding from Greylock Partners and Gaorong Capital.

In February 2019 Nuro raised $940 million from SoftBank Group, which valued the company at $2.7 billion. Nuro said it would use the funds to expand its delivery service to new areas, add new partners, expand its fleet and grow its business. In September 2019, the company was ranked  on LinkedIn's Top 50 Startups List for 2019.

In November 2020, Nuro announced that they raised $500 million in their Series C funding round led by T. Rowe Price, with a post-money valuation of $5 billion.

In December 2020, Nuro acquired self-driving trucking startup Ike Robotics. Over 55 Ike employees (including its three founders) joined Nuro's staff after acquisition.

In August 2021, Nuro announced that it would spend $40 million on the construction of a manufacturing facility and test track for its self-driving robot vehicles, located in southern Nevada.

In November 2022, Nuro announced layoffs of 20 percent of its staff, or approximately 300 employees.

Partnerships
In June 2018, Nuro announced its first partnership with Kroger to test the fully autonomous delivery of groceries. On June 17, 2019, Nuro announced its partnership with Domino's Pizza. Nuro and Domino's announced that the service would launch in Houston later in 2019. The company began prescription delivery through CVS Pharmacy in May 2020. In December 2021, Nuro announced a partnership to commercially deliver 7-Eleven goods.

In September 2022, Uber and Nuro Announced 10-year partnership for autonomous food deliveries starting in California and Texas.

Product 
Nuro officially launched in January 2018 and revealed its first product, an electric self-driving local commerce delivery vehicle. This vehicle is designed to carry only cargo, with space for 12 grocery bags in the first model. 

The pilot launched on August 16, 2018, in Scottsdale, Arizona at a Fry's Food and Drug store. Initially, self-driving Toyota Prius cars were used for the pilot. On December 18, 2018, the R1 was officially launched into the pilot. In February 2020, Nuro announced its plans to test R2, the second generation of self-driving vehicles, in Houston, Texas. 

In April 2020, Nuro announced that the R2 prototype was being used to transport medical supplies around medical facilities in California. The R2 is designed with no steering wheel, side view mirrors, or pedals.

See also 
 Cruise LLC
 Argo AI

References

External links 
 

Electric vehicles
Emerging technologies
Robotics organizations
Self-driving car companies
American companies established in 2016
Companies based in Mountain View, California